Márcio Torres and Izak van der Merwe were the defending champions but decided not to participate.
Rodrigo Grilli and Leonardo Kirche defeated Christian Lindell and João Souza 6–3, 6–3 in the final.

Seeds
First-seeded pair received a bye in the first round.

Draw

Draw

References
 Doubles Draw

BH Tennis Open International Cup - Doubles
BH Tennis Open International Cup